is a Japanese ice hockey player for Mikage Gretz and the Japanese national team. She participated at the 2016 IIHF Women's World Championship.

Ono competed at the 2018 Winter Olympics.

References

External links

1981 births
Living people
Ice hockey players at the 2018 Winter Olympics
Japanese women's ice hockey forwards
Olympic ice hockey players of Japan
Asian Games medalists in ice hockey
Ice hockey players at the 2003 Asian Winter Games
Ice hockey players at the 2007 Asian Winter Games
Ice hockey players at the 2017 Asian Winter Games
Medalists at the 2003 Asian Winter Games
Medalists at the 2007 Asian Winter Games
Medalists at the 2017 Asian Winter Games
Asian Games gold medalists for Japan
Asian Games silver medalists for Japan